Viets or VIET may refer to:

The Vietnamese people
Mount Viets, mountain in Antarctica
Viets' Tavern, tavern in East Granby, Connecticut
Viets Hotel, building in Grand Forks, North Dakota
 Yue people

People
Alexander Viets Griswold (1766–1843), American Anglican bishop
Alexander Viets Griswold Allen (1841–1908), American theologian
Elaine Viets, American columnist and writer
Hermann Viets, American engineer
Richard Noyes Viets, American diplomat

Other